Berkeley 86 is a young open cluster in Cygnus. It is located inside the OB Stellar association Cyg OB 1, and obscured by a foreground dust cloud.

References 

Open clusters
Cygnus (constellation)
Star-forming regions